Orbicom may refer to:

 Orbicom-UNESCO, a UNESCO committee fostering education and growth of communications technology internationally.
 Orbicom Pty Ltd, a Wireless Telecommunication Services provider.